The 2016–17 Turkish Handball Super League is the 39th season of the Turkish Handball Super League, Turkish's top-tier handball league. A total of fourteen teams contest this season's league, which began on 17 September 2016 and is scheduled to conclude in April 2017.

Beşiktaş J.K. are the defending champions, having beaten B.B Ankara Spor 3–0 in the previous season's playoff finals.

Format
The competition format for the 2016–17 season consists of a home-and-away round-robin system.

Teams

The following 14 clubs compete in the Turkish Handball Super League during the 2016–17 season. Marmara Gücü SK, Trabzon and Ankara Il Özel Idare were relegated from the previous season and Beykoz Belediyesi GSK, Selçuklu Belediyespor, Aziziye Belediyesi Termal Spor and Yozgat Bozok Spor were promoted from 2015-16 Turkish 1.lig.

Standings

Results

References

External links
 Turkish Handball Super League

Turkey
Handball competitions in Turkey
2016 in Turkish sport
2017 in Turkish sport